Neocrepidodera nobilis is a species of flea beetle from Chrysomelidae family that can be found in France, Italy, and Switzerland.

References

Beetles described in 1904
Beetles of Europe
nobilis